Tribu may refer to:

Tribu, a ceremonial bell in Tibetan Buddhism
La Tribu, a Canadian independent record label founded in 1999 in Quebec
Tribu (film), a 2007 Filipino crime drama film
SEAT Tribu, a compact SUV concept car built by SEAT